is a series of fighting games created by Sega-AM2 and designer Yu Suzuki. The original Virtua Fighter was released in October 1993 and has received four main sequels and several spin-offs. The highly influential first Virtua Fighter game is widely recognized as the first 3D fighting game released.

Gameplay

Similar to most other fighting games, the default gameplay system of the Virtua Fighter series involves two combatants needing to win two of three rounds, with each round being 30 seconds long or more. Combatants utilize various attacks in an attempt to deplete the other fighter's stamina gauge and deal a knockout (K.O.), winning a round. If a character is knocked out (or falls out) of the ring, their opponent wins the round in a Ring Out. An extra round is necessary if a double knockout (both players knocking each other out at the same time) occurs in a previous round and the match is tied one round each. In this round, players fight on a small stage wherein one hit is enough to knock the other out and achieve victory.

The basic control scheme is simple, using only an 8-way control stick and three buttons (Punch, Kick, Guard). Through various timings, positions, and button combinations, players input normal and special moves for each character. This allows extensive lists of moves to exist for a given character within the limited control scheme. Traditionally, in the single-player mode, the player runs a gauntlet of characters in the game (which may include one's doppelgänger) all the way to the final boss.

Virtua Fighter also owes its simplistic game design to a notable lack of secondary game mechanics, such as any special meters or other emergent elements present in the vast majority of modern fighting games. In addition, every playable character introduced throughout the Virtua Fighter series utilizes a fighting style heavily based in real-world martial arts. Although some creative liberties are taken for the effective execution of certain techniques and styles, the series features no supernatural powers and scarce few superhuman feats, creating a grounded and semi-realistic system of combat.

History
The following is a list of games in the Virtua Fighter series:

Arcade fighting games
The brainchild of Sega AM2's Yu Suzuki, Virtua Fighter was released in 1993 as an arcade game using hardware jointly developed by aerospace simulation technology by the company that is now known as Lockheed Martin and Sega's most prominent and well known studio AM2, originally crafted for the arcade system dubbed the Model 1. It is considered the first polygon-based fighting game. It introduced the eight initial fighters as well as the boss, Dural. Sony developers have confirmed that the game inspired Sony to create the first PlayStation console and to focus more on 3D games, more so than the main competitor in Japan, the Sega Saturn.

Virtua Fighter 2 was released in November 1994, adding two new fighters: Shun Di and Lion Rafale. It was built using the Model 2 hardware, rendering characters and backgrounds with filtered texture mapping and motion capture. A slightly-tweaked upgrade, Virtua Fighter 2.1, followed soon after.

Virtua Fighter 3 came out in 1996, with the introduction of Taka-Arashi and Aoi Umenokoji. Aside from improving the graphics via use of the Model 3 (such as mipmapping, multi-layer anti-aliasing, trilinear filtering and specular highlighting), the game also introduced undulations in some stages and a fourth button, Dodge. Virtua Fighter 3tb in 1997 was the first major update in series history, implementing tournament battles featuring more than two characters (though not simultaneously as in Tekken Tag Tournament).

Virtua Fighter 4, which introduced Vanessa Lewis and Lei-Fei and removed Taka-Arashi, was released on the NAOMI 2 hardware in 2001 instead of hardware from a joint collaboration with Lockheed Martin. The game also removed the uneven battlegrounds and the Dodge button from the previous game. The title is consistently popular in its home arcade market. Virtua Fighter 4: Evolution, released in 2002, was the first update to add new characters, these being Brad Burns and Goh Hinogami. Virtua Fighter 4: Final Tuned, an upgrade to Evolution, was released in the arcades in 2004. In Japan, Virtua Fighter 4 was famous for spearheading and opening the market for internet functionality in arcades. VF.NET started in Japan in 2001, and since companies have created their own arcade networks, E-Amusement by Konami, NESiCAxLive by Taito and Square Enix, and ALL.Net by Sega.

Virtua Fighter 5 was released in Japan on July 12, 2006 for Sega's Lindbergh arcade board and introduced yet two more new characters, Eileen and El Blaze. Similar to its predecessor, two revisions were later released. Virtua Fighter 5 R, released on July 24, 2008, saw the return of Taka-Arashi while introducing a new fighter, Jean Kujo. Virtua Fighter 5 Final Showdown was released in arcades on July 29, 2010.

Console fighting games

The first Virtua Fighter game was ported to the Saturn in 1994 (1995 outside Japan), just months before fellow 3D-fighter Tekken was released. The console port, which was nearly identical to the arcade game, sold at a nearly 1:1 ratio with the Saturn hardware at launch. The port of Virtua Fighter 2 on the Saturn for Christmas 1995 was considered faithful to the arcade original. While the game's 3D backgrounds were now rendered in 2D, resulting in some scenery such as the bridge in Shun Di's river stage being removed, the remainder of the game was kept intact. It became the top-selling Saturn game in Japan. Ports of the original Virtua Fighter and Virtua Fighter 2 with enhanced graphics were also released for the PC. Virtua Fighter 2 was remade as a 2D fighter for the Mega Drive/Genesis in 1996, omitting the characters Shun and Lion, and later re-released on the PlayStation 2 as a part of the Sega Ages series. Yakuza 5 was released in 2012 in Japan and in 2015 worldwide and features Virtua Fighter 2 as a mini-game. The only port of Virtua Fighter 3 was for the Sega Dreamcast by Genki (instead of AM2) with Virtua Fighter 3tb in 1998 for the Japanese release of the console.

In a reverse of the usual development cycle for the series, an update of the original Virtua Fighter called Virtua Fighter Remix was released for the Saturn and later ported to the arcade.

Virtua Fighter Mini, based on the anime series, was created for the Game Gear and released in North America and Europe as Virtua Fighter Animation. The game was later ported to the Master System by Tec Toy and released only in Brazil. Brazil itself was a market where the series was very popular.

Following Sega's exit from the hardware market in mid-2001, Virtua Fighter 4 was ported by Sega to the PlayStation 2 in 2002. Outside of a slight downgrade in graphics, the port of the game was considered well done. This port was followed by Virtua Fighter 4: Evolution, an update that added two new characters as well as a host of game balancing tweaks, in 2003. Evolution was immediately released under the PlayStation 2's "Greatest Hits" label in the United States, which lowered its initial sticker price.

With the 2003 PlayStation 2 release of Virtua Fighter 4: Evolution arriving in time for the series' tenth anniversary, a remake of Virtua Fighter, Virtua Fighter 10th Anniversary, was released exclusively on the PlayStation 2. While the music, stages and low-polygon visual style were retained from the first game, the character roster, animations, mechanics and movesets were taken from Evolution. In the previous PS2 release of Virtua Fighter 4, a button code would make the player's character look like a VF1 model. In Japan, the game was included as part of a box set with a book titled Virtua Fighter 10th Anniversary: Memory of a Decade and a DVD. The box set was released in November 2003 and was published by Enterbrain. In North America, the game was included within the home version of Evolution, and in Europe it was only available as a promotional item; it was not sold at retail.

A port of Virtua Fighter 5 was released for the PlayStation 3 in Japan and North America in February 2007, and March 2007 in Europe. The PlayStation 3 port is considered extremely faithful to the arcade original, due in part to the arcade hardware (based on Sega Lindbergh platform) and PlayStation 3 hardware sharing NVidia-provided GPUs of comparable capability. A port for the Xbox 360 was released in October 2007 in Japan and North America, and December 2007 in Europe, and contains the additions of online fighting via Xbox Live, improved graphics, and gameplay balances from the newer revision of the arcade game. For years, the designers have held strong on their refusal to add an online mode to console versions of the games; because the gameplay relies so much on timing, any lag would ruin the experience. Eventually, with the Xbox 360 release of VF5, Sega decided to add online capabilities via Xbox Live. Virtua Fighter 5 Final Showdown was released as a downloadable title for the Xbox 360 and PlayStation 3 in June 2012, with online play available in both versions. An updated version of Virtua Fighter 5 Final Showdown named Version B was released in Japanese arcades in 2015. Yakuza 6: The Song of Life was released for PlayStation 4 in 2016 in Japan and 2018 worldwide and the game features Virtua Fighter 5 Final Showdown Version B as a mini-game, making the release of Yakuza 6 also the PlayStation 4 debut for the Virtua Fighter series.

Spin-offs and adaptations
Due to the success of Virtua Fighter 2, a super deformed version called Virtua Fighter Kids was released for the Sega Saturn and arcades in 1996. 1996 also saw the release of Fighters Megamix for the Sega Saturn, a crossover that pitted the cast of Virtua Fighter 2 against the cast of Fighting Vipers as well as other characters in AM2-developed games. Megamix served as a home preview to Virtua Fighter 3 in a few ways, as the game featured the dodge ability found in VF3 and the Virtua Fighter characters had their moves updated to those found in VF3. Some stages and music from VF3 are also in the game. The Virtua Fighter Kids versions of Akira and Sarah appear as hidden playable characters in the game; the character Siba, who was omitted from the first Virtua Fighter also appears as a hidden playable character.

In 1996, AM2 began developing a Saturn RPG based on the series, titled Virtua Fighter RPG: Akira's Story, with Akira as the hero. Development moved to the Dreamcast, the Virtua Fighter connection was dropped and the game became Shenmue, released in 1999. Virtua Quest, a simplified role-playing video game (which was also known as Virtua Fighter RPG) with new characters aimed at the children's market, was released for the GameCube in 2004 and the PlayStation 2 in 2005. The Virtua Fighters had their incarnations from Virtua Fighter 4.

During the late 2000s, both Sega and Namco showed interest in a possible cross over between Virtua Fighter and Tekken. This crossover would combine all the characters and fighting styles from both games, but any other inclusions are unknown at the moment. Prior to that, both franchises were represented as Mii Brawler costumes in the Nintendo crossover Super Smash Bros. for 3DS and Wii U, in which Ryu from the Street Fighter series first playable too, whereas Akira himself (based on 10th Anniversary version) physically appeared in the sequel Super Smash Bros. Ultimate as an assist trophy character where Kazuya Mishima from Tekken, including Ken Masters as Ryu's echo fighter first playable too.

Other media
A 35 episodes-long anime television series Virtua Fighter was produced by Tōkyō Movie Shinsha, originally airing on TV Tokyo between 1995 and 1996. In 1995 Shogakukan began publishing a Virtua Fighter 2 manga, with creative oversight from Sega AM2 to ensure the characters were portrayed consistently with their original vision. The games' manga adaptation was written by Kyōichi Nanatsuki and illustrated by Yoshihide Fujiwara starting in 1997. In Japan, Virtua Fighter CG Portrait Series, wherein each character in the series had their own Saturn CD showcasing various poses of the fighter, was released around the same time as well. People who collected all the discs could send in their proof of purchases to get a special Portrait CD of Dural. In 2014, Sega formed the production company Stories International for film and TV projects based on their games with Virtua Fighter as an animated project.

The first Virtua Fighter merchandise was a set of dolls of the first Virtua Fighter cast which Sega produced for their UFO Catchers (a model of claw crane). These proved so popular that supplies ran out almost immediately, so Sega made additional batches and began producing other Virtua Fighter merchandise to put in the UFO Catchers. When these also proved successful, Sega realized that Virtua Fighter merchandise had mainstream potential, and began licensing the property to merchandise producers such as Bandai.

Sega has also released soundtrack CDs for the games, and even an album of original theme music for the characters called Dancing Shadows.

Characters

In other games
In Sega's music video game Project DIVA 2nd, Vocaloid Megurine Luka can obtain a Sarah Bryant outfit for gameplay. Jacky Bryant and Akira Yuki appear in Sonic & Sega All-Stars Racing as partners competing against other Sega characters in races. Akira Yuki, Sarah Bryant and Pai Chan, appear as guest characters in Tecmo Koei's Dead or Alive 5, followed by Jacky Bryant in Dead or Alive 5 Ultimate. Akira Yuki, Pai Chan and Dural appear in the crossover RPG Project X Zone, which features characters from Capcom, Namco Bandai Games, and Sega. Akira Yuki, Pai Chan and Dural return in Project X Zone 2 along with Kage-Maru. In Dengeki Bunko Fighting Climax, Akira Yuki and Pai Chan appears as a playable guest boss where Akira is playable and Pai as assist, though they became regulars in the Ignition update. In Super Smash Bros. for Nintendo 3DS and Wii U and Super Smash Bros. Ultimate,  Mii Brawler costumes based on Jacky Bryant's modern appearance and Akira Yuki's first appearance were released as downloadable content. Akira would also appear in Ultimate as an assist trophy in his appearance in Virtua Fighter 10th Anniversary (a polygonal form from the first game with both voice lines and a move set from Virtua Fighter 4 Evolution).

Reception
Virtua Fighter 2 also sold more than 40,000 arcade units worldwide, adding up to more than 80,000 unit sales of both games by 1996. Virtua Fighter and Virtua Fighter 2 became Sega's best-selling arcade games of all time, surpassing Out Run (1986), which itself had sold 30,000 arcade cabinets by 1994. Virtua Fighter 3 sold a further 30,000 arcade cabinets by 1997, adding up to 110,000 arcade unit sales for the three games combined by 1997.

In 1994, Virtua Fighter was the year's highest-grossing arcade game in Japan, one of the year's top five highest-grossing arcade video games in the United States, and one of the year's most popular coin-ops in the United Kingdom. In 1995, Virtua Fighter 2 was the year's highest-grossing arcade game in Japan, and one of the year's top ten best-selling arcade games in the United States.

On the Sega Saturn, Virtua Fighter and Virtua Fighter 2 combined together had sold more than  copies worldwide by 1996. Virtua Fighter and Virtua Fighter Remix sold a combined 1,067,036 copies in Japan. Virtua Fighter 2 sold  copies in Japan, and more than 500,000 bundled copies in the United States, for a combined  copies sold in Japan and the United States.

Legacy
Virtua Fighter is often considered to be the grandfather of 3D fighting games, with each iteration being noted for advancing the graphical and technical aspects of games in the genre. Many 3D fighting game series such as Tekken and Dead or Alive were heavily influenced by Virtua Fighter, and the original Dead or Alive ran on the Model 2 hardware. In 1998, the series was recognized by the Smithsonian Institution for contributions in the field of Art and Entertainment, and became a part of the Smithsonian Institution's Permanent Research Collection on Information Technology Innovation. Its arcade cabinets are kept at the Smithsonian's National Museum of American History, where Virtua Fighter is the only video game on permanent display. In 1999, Next Generation listed the Virtua Fighter series as number 8 on their "Top 50 Games of All Time", commenting that, "Virtua Fighter is the most elegant fighting game ever created. With only two attack buttons, the game still offers an astonishingly wide range of martial art styles."

Virtua Fighter played a crucial role in popularizing 3D polygon graphics. The success of the Virtua Fighter series resulted in Guinness World Records awarding the series seven world records in Guinness World Records Gamer's Edition 2008, including "First Polygon Based Fighting Game", "First 3D Fighting Game", and "First Fighting Game for a 32-bit Console". 1UP listed Virtua Fighter as one of the 50 most important games of all time, crediting it for creating the 3D fighting game genre, and more generally, demonstrating the potential of 3D polygon human characters (as the first to implement them in a useful way), showing the potential of realistic gameplay (introducing a character physics system and realistic character animations for the time), and introducing fighting game concepts such as the ring-out and the block button. Virtua Fighter 2 on the Sega Model 2 introduced the use of texture-mapped 3D characters, and motion capture animation technology. Virtua Fighter 3 on the Sega Model 3 further advanced real-time graphics technology, with Computer and Video Games in 1996 comparing it to CGI and referring to it as "the most astounding display of video game graphic muscle ever in the history of this industry." In 1997, Next Generation stated that Virtua Fighter had supplanted Street Fighter as the premier fighting game series.

Some of the Sony Computer Entertainment (SCE) staff involved in the creation of the original PlayStation video game console credit Virtua Fighter as inspiration for the PlayStation's 3D graphics hardware. According to SCE's Shigeo Maruyama, the PlayStation was originally being considered as a 2D-focused hardware, and it was not until the release of Virtua Fighter that they decided to design the PlayStation as a 3D-focused hardware. Toby Gard also cited Virtua Fighter as an influence on the use of polygonal characters in Tomb Raider and the creation of Lara Croft. John Romero also cited Virtua Fighter as a major influence on the creation of 3D first-person shooter Quake. Team Ico's Fumito Ueda also cited Virtua Fighter as an influence on his animation work.

A late 1995 article in Next Generation declared that "The Virtua Fighter series has been, and will continue to be, the yardstick by which all next generation arcade and console fighting games will be measured for a long time coming." According to Eurogamer: "One of Yu Suzuki's most enduring creations once christened every round of new arcade hardware, was a pioneer in 3D graphics and helped establish online fighting. All the while, beneath those achievements emerged a game of exceptional depth and nuance." 1UP.com opined: "Due to its innovation, Virtua Fighter not only influenced competitors' games -- it basically created a genre. Technically, every 3D fighter that came after it owes Virtua Fighter for establishing that a 3D fighter could work.  Even today, Tekken still takes inspiration from Sega's series." Game Informer'''s Andy McNamara wrote: "It has always been my opinion that the Virtua Fighter series is the most intense and balanced of all the 3D fighters on the market. Its control scheme is intuitive, its pacing perfect, and its depth unmatched." in 2006, IGN ranked Virtua Fighter as the 25th greatest game series of all time, explaining that "no other 3D fighter has equaled VF'' in terms of difficulty and depth."

Notes

References

External links

Virtua Fighter at MobyGames
Demo of Virtua Fighter PC for Windows 95 hosted by Sega of America

 
Fighting games
Fighting video games by series
Video games about ninja
Sega Games franchises
Video games designed by Yu Suzuki
Video games developed in Japan
Video game franchises introduced in 1993
Muay Thai video games